Meridel Rubenstein (born 1948) is an American photographer and installation artist based out of New Mexico. She is known for her large-format photographs incorporating sculptures and unusual media.

Biography

Rubenstein was born in Detroit, Michigan in 1948. In 1970, Rubenstein earned a bachelor's degree in social science, with a film-making emphasis from Sarah Lawrence College. She received an M.A. from the University of New Mexico in 1974 and an M.F.A. from the same institution in 1977, studying with Beaumont Newhall and Franck Van Deren Coke.  She received a Guggenheim Fellowship in 1981 and a National Endowment for the Arts Fellowship in 1983.  From 1985 to 1990 she was head of the photography department at San Francisco State University. In 1990 she returned to New Mexico to teach at the Institute of American Indian Arts. In 2006, she received a fellowship from the Pollock-Krasner Foundation. She currently lives and works in Santa Fe, New Mexico and Singapore.

Rubenstein is best known for her large-format photographs incorporating sculptures and unusual media, such as Monks in a Canoe from 2000-2001 in the collection of the Honolulu Museum of Art. This work consists of a dye transfer on glass and a found wooden dug-out canoe. Her photographic series, The Volcano Cycle, is a component of the larger project, Eden Turned on its Side.

Collections
The Honolulu Museum of Art, the Museum für Kunst und Gewerbe Hamburg (Hamburg, Germany), the New Mexico Museum of Art, the San Francisco Museum of Modern Art, and Smithsonian American Art Museum (Washington, DC) are among the public collections holding work by Meridel Rubenstein.

References

Further reading
 Davis, Tim, "Beyond the Sacred and the Profane: Cultural Landscape Photography in America, 1930-1990", in Mapping American Culture, ed. Wayne Franklin and Michael Steiner, Univ. of Iowa Press, Iowa City, 1992, pp. 191–230.
 Garner, Gretchen, Reclaiming Paradise: American Women Photograph the Land, Tweed Museum of Art, University of Minnesota, Duluth, 1987, pp. 38–39.
 Green, Jonathan, American Photography -A Critical History, Harry Abrams, 1984, pp. 149,154, 211.
 Jussim, Estelle, Landscape as Photograph, Yale University Press, 1985, pp. 17, 18, 128-30.
 Rubenstein, Meridel, “Georgia O’Keeffe as a Role Model”, in From the Faraway Nearby: Georgia O’Keeffe as Icon, ed. Christopher Merrill and Ellen Bradbury, Addison-Wesley, 1992, pp. 187–92.
 Rubenstein, Meridel, La Gente De La Luz, New Mexico Museum of Fine Arts, Santa Fe, 1977.
 Rubenstein, Meridel and Ellen Zweig, Critical Mass, New Mexico Museum of Fine Arts, Santa Fe, 1993.
 Smith, Joshua P. and Merry A. Foresta, The Photography of Invention – American Pictures of the 1980s, National Museum of American Art, MIT Press, pp. 166–67.
 Yates, Steve, The Essential Landscape, Univ of New Mexico Press,1985,pp. 23,132-5.

External links
 Meridel Rubenstein on AskArt.com

1948 births
Living people
American installation artists
Artists from Detroit
Artists from New Mexico
Sarah Lawrence College alumni
University of New Mexico alumni
20th-century American women photographers
20th-century American photographers